Terrace at the Mall, Central Park (French: Terrasse au centre commercial, Central Park) is an oil on panel painting by the American painter William Merritt Chase. It was completed in 1890. The dimensions of the painting is 29.2 by 41.9 centimeters and is housed in a private collection.

Description
The Central Park Mall was a favorite subject for late-century impressionists and urban realists. Chase depicts the garden outside the mall and the mall surrounded by trees.

References

1890 paintings
Paintings by William Merritt Chase